Zele may refer to:

Geography
Zele, Belgium
Zele, Poland

Languages
Zele language of Nigeria

People
Dorina Zele (born 1992), Hungarian basketball player

Others
Zagato Zele 1000, an electric microcar